Mahboba or Mahbuba may refer to:

 Mahboba Rawi, an Afghan-Australian charity worker, see Australia 2020 Summit participants
 Mahboba's Promise, a charity set up by Mahboba Rawi
 Mahboba Hoqomal, Afghan politician who held several important appointments during Hamid Karzai's Presidency
 Mahbuba, a slave owned by Hermann, Fürst von Pückler-Muskau